The Executive Vice President of the European Commission for A Europe Fit for the Digital Age is an Executive Vice President of the European Commission responsible for media and information issues such as telecoms and IT. The current officeholder is Margrethe Vestager since December 2019.

The portfolio was previously Commissioner for Digital Economy and Society (previously for Digital Agenda). Mariya Gabriel served as Digital Economy and Society Commissioner from 2017 to 2019.

Viviane Reding
Viviane Reding (2004-2010) found a relatively popular policy in seeking to lower roaming charges of mobile phones when travelling within the European Union, stating: "For years, mobile roaming charges have remained unjustifiably high. We are therefore tackling one of the last borders within Europe's internal market". Her legislation to cap roaming charges was approved by the Parliament in April 2007. Reding's successor Neelie Kroes greatly extended the range of the roaming regulation, to include data charges amongst others.

On 7 April 2006 the commission launched the new ".eu" TLD for websites for EU companies and citizens wishing to have a non-national European internet address. This has proved popular with 2.5M being registered by April 2007. It is now the seventh most popular TLD worldwide, and third in Europe (after .de and .uk)

Reding has also proposed that major European telecom companies be forced to separate their network and service operations to promote competition in the market. The companies, including France Telecom and Deutsche Telekom, would still own their networks but the separate management structure would be obliged to treat other operators on an equal basis in offering access to the network. This is opposed to separate ideas to force a full breakup of such companies.

List of commissioners
In the previous Commission information society was linked with Enterprise (now linked with Industry).

See also
 .eu
 Directorate General for Communication Networks, Content and Technology
 Regulation on roaming charges in the European Union

References

External links
 Neelie Kroes
 Directorate General for Communication Networks, Content and Technology
 Digital Agenda for Europe
 Juncker Commission takes office, Press release, 1. 11. 2014

Information technology organizations based in Europe
Digital Agenda